Xestocephalus lunatus is a species of leafhopper in the family Cicadellidae.

References

Further reading

External links

 

Aphrodinae
Insects described in 1933